Liquid fire may refer to:

Warfare
 Greek fire, an ancient and medieval incendiary weapon
 Hot oil, an early thermal weapon
 Meng Huo You, Ancient Chinese petroleum weapon
 Flamethrower, modern incendiary weapon that projects flaming liquids
 Napalm, flammable liquids used in modern warfare

Other uses
 Liquid Fire: The Best of John Scofield, a 1994 compilation album by John Scofield
 "Liquid Fire", a single by Gojira from L'Enfant Sauvage
 Liquid Fire, a declarative animation system for the Ember.js frontend framework
 Liquid Fire, a brand of drain cleaner containing sulfuric acid and an acid corrosion inhibitor